Casimiro Berenguer Padilla  was a Puerto Rican nationalist.  He was the military instructor of the Cadets of the Republic (Cadetes de la República) who received permission from Ponce Mayor Tormos Diego to celebrate a parade on March 21, 1937, in commemoration of the abolition of slavery and to protest the jailing of its leaders, including Pedro Albizu Campos. The parade resulted in the police riot known as the Ponce massacre.

Early years
Casimiro Berenguer Padilla was born in Cabo Rojo, Puerto Rico. His parents were Alejandro Berenguer, a mason, and Eugenia Padilla, a housewife.  At age 6, he emigrated to the Dominican Republic with his parents, where he spent his childhood and part of his youth. He also learned to trade as a cobbler there. In 1929, he returned to Puerto Rico and established a shoe repair shop in Ponce.

Background
Berenguer Padilla was an instructor of the Cadets of the Republic in  Ponce. He set up his shoe repair shop at Marina and Aurora streets, at a building used by the Puerto Rican Nationalist Party to celebrate its meetings in that city. The Insular Police carried out the 1937 Ponce massacre, under the instructions of US-installed governor Blanton Winship, outside this building.  

In 1938, Berenguer and other Nationalists were accused of the murder of Col. Luis Irizarry of the Puerto Rican National Guard, in their attempt on the life of U.S.-installed governor Blanton Winship in retaliation for the Blanton-ordered Ponce massacre. The other Nationalists also accused of murder by the government of Blanton Winship in relation to the massacre were Luis Castro Quesada, Julio Pinto Gandía, Lorenzo Piñeiro, (Interim President and Interim Secretary General of the Puerto Rican Nationalist Party), Plinio Graciani, Tomás López de Victoria, Martín González Ruiz, Elifaz Escobar, Luis Ángel Correa, Santiago González, and Orlando Colón Leyro. Of this group, only Tomás López de Victoria, Santiago González, Elifaz Escobar and Berenguer Padilla were members of the cadets. A grand jury was convened, and the accused were tried, but all the Nationalists, including Berenguer, were released.

On September 28, 1938, Berenguer was convicted with other Nacionalistas in connection with the attempted assassination of Governor Winship during the celebration of the 40th anniversary of the U.S. military invasion of Puerto Rico. The other Nationalists convicted were Tomás López de Victoria, Elifaz Escobar, Santiago González, Vicente Morciglio, Leocadio López, Juan Pietri, Guillermo Larrogaiti, and Prudencio Segarra.

Death and legacy
Berenguer's remains were brought from the Dominican Republic and interred at the Panteon Nacional Roman Baldorioty de Castro in Ponce on the 70th anniversary of the Ponce massacre, March 21, 2007.

Notes

See also

Cadets of the Republic 
Puerto Rican Independence Movement
Puerto Rican Nationalist Party Revolts of the 1950s
Puerto Rican Nationalist Party
Ponce massacre
Río Piedras massacre
Jayuya Uprising
Utuado Uprising
Puerto Rican Independence Party
History of Puerto Rico
Gilberto Concepción de Gracia
Blanca Canales
Lolita Lebrón

References

External links
The Ponce Massacre(1937)

1909 births
2000 deaths
Puerto Rican people of Catalan descent
Puerto Rican Nationalist Party politicians
Members of the Puerto Rican Nationalist Party
Puerto Rican party leaders
Puerto Rican prisoners and detainees
Imprisoned Puerto Rican independence activists
Nationalists from Ponce
Burials at Panteón Nacional Román Baldorioty de Castro
Puerto Rican independence activists
Puerto Rican nationalists
People from Cabo Rojo, Puerto Rico